Alu Dadashevich Alkhanov (born 20 January 1957) is a Russian politician and the former president of Russia's Chechen Republic. He is a career police officer who fought within the ranks of the Russian Armed Forces during the First Chechen War. He was elected as president on 30 August 2004. On 15 February 2007, Russian President Vladimir Putin dismissed Alkhanov as the Chechen President and appointed him a Deputy Justice Minister of Russia.

Biography
Born in Taldykorgan Province, Kazakhstan, Alkhanov joined the Soviet Armed Forces on leaving school. He joined the Soviet Militsiya service in 1983, graduating from the transport police school in Mogilev (now in Belarus). He went on to the High Police School in Rostov-on-Don before becoming Deputy Head of the North Caucasus Transport Department of the former Chechen-Ingushetia government in Grozny in 1992. He was later promoted to head the department, a post which he held until 1997.

When the First Chechen War broke out in 1994, Alkhanov supported the Russian side against the separatists. He was decorated with the Order of Courage for his actions during the separatists' assault on Grozny in 1996. In April 2003, he was appointed Interior Minister of Chechnya in the government of Akhmad Kadyrov and was made a Major General of the Chechen police. When Kadyrov was assassinated on 9 May 2004, Akhnanov became the favoured candidate of the Russian government.

On 1 June 2006, Alkhanov said he would prefer his republic be governed by Sharia law and suggested adapting the Islamic code.

He is widely seen to be in conflict with Ramzan Kadyrov, a former rebel fighter and Chechen Republic's Prime Minister with presidential ambitions. Kadyrov eventually replaced Alkhanov as President in February 2007, following by placing his own people in all the leading positions.

Alu Alkhanov is married, with three children.

Election controversy 
Alu Alkhanov's election in August 2004 was controversial from the outset. The election of his predecessor had been marred by allegations of ballot stuffing, voter intimidation by Russian soldiers and the exclusion of possible separatist candidates. As a career bureaucrat, Alkhanov had no obvious popular base and was seen by many observers as the placeman of the government of Russian President Vladimir Putin. Critics of Russian policy in Chechnya claimed that the government would not permit Alkhanov to be defeated, and that the outcome of the vote had been predetermined well in advance.

Alkhanov faced seven challengers. The most serious of these, Malik Saidullayev, a Moscow-based Chechen businessman, was barred from standing on the technicality of failing to fill his application correctly. The other six challengers had little recognition within Chechnya and several had ties with the government. They were:

 Abdula Bugayev, an historian and director of the Chechen branch of the Modern Humanities Academy. He finished a distant second to Kadyrov in 2003 with 5.7% of the votes.
 Movsar Khamidov, a colonel in the Chechen department of the Federal Security Service (FSB), the successor to the KGB.
 Vakha Visayev, an economist and an adviser to the acting Chechen president, Sergey Abramov.
 Mukhmud-Khasan Asakov, a staff member of the Chechen State Council.
 Magomed Aidamirov, a businessman from the village of Tolstoy-Yurt.
 Umar Abuyev, director-general of the Chechen Petrochemical Company.

Alkhanov's platform was effectively a continuation of his predecessor's policies, with Chechnya continuing to remain part of Russia; economic autonomy; attracting aid and investment; cutting unemployment and the Russian military presence; and opening peace talks with separatist leader Aslan Maskhadov.

In the event, Alkhanov won by a landslide majority with 73.67% of the votes on an 85.25% turnout. Khamidov was second, with 8.95 percent, and Abdula Bugayev came third, with 4.5%. Visayev was fourth, Abuyev fifth, Asakov sixth and Aidamarov seventh, gaining between 0.6% to 4.3% of the vote. 1% of voters voted "against all candidates".

The results of the election were regarded with scepticism by some outside observers and the Chechen opposition. The U.S. Department of State, and International Helsinki Federation for Human Rights questioned the fairness of the elections and highlighting the disqualification of Saidullayev. The elections was internationally monitored by the monitors from CIS and LAS; western monitors didn't participate in the monitoring of the elections despite being invited. Polling conditions have been questioned; Khamidov has said that his campaign staff had recorded numerous irregularities and will contest the vote results in court.

Honours and awards
 Order of Merit for the Fatherland, 4th class (February 15, 2007) – for outstanding contribution to the socio-economic development of the strengthening of Russian statehood and constitutional order
 Order of Courage
 Order of Honour (October 12, 2011) – for labour achievements and many years of diligent work
 Medal For Courage
 Medal "For Distinction in the Protection of Public Order"
 Gratitude of the President of the Russian Federation
 Diploma of the Government of the Russian Federation (January 20, 2007) – for his great personal contribution to the recovery of the economy and social sphere of the Chechen Republic

See also
Ramzan Kadyrov
Federal government in Chechnya
Second Chechen War

External links
 The increasingly deadly struggle for power between Kadyrov and Alkhanov Jamestown Foundation September 28, 2006
Mosnews coverage of election win
Q&A: The Chechen election (BBC News, August 27, 2004)
Press Round-up of election (The Guardian, September 1, 2004)
Includes editorial quotes from The Washington Post, Moscow Times, Pravda and more.

1957 births
Living people
Russian Muslims
Russian Sunni Muslims
People from Taldykorgan
Heads of the Chechen Republic
People of the Chechen wars
Russian police chiefs
Recipients of the Order of Courage
Recipients of the Order of Honour (Russia)
Recipients of the Medal "For Courage" (Russia)
Russian people of Chechen descent
Chechen people
Recipients of the Order "For Merit to the Fatherland", 4th class
Gendargenoy